Charles Triplett "Trip" O'Ferrall (October 21, 1840 – September 22, 1905) was a Virginian politician who served as a U.S. Representative from 1883 to 1894 and as the 42nd Governor of Virginia from 1894 to 1898.

Early and family life
Charles O'Ferrall was born in Brucetown, Virginia (then in Frederick County, Virginia, now near Berkeley Springs, West Virginia) to John and Jane Laurens Green O'Ferrall. His father was an innkeeper and former member of the Virginia General Assembly who was elected Clerk of Court of Morgan County in 1851. O'Ferrell was educated in the local schools.

While recovering from a wound during the Battle of Upperville in the American Civil War in Enterprise, Mississippi, O'Ferrall met Annie Hand, whom he married on February 8, 1865, before returning to active duty. They had two children. After her death, he married Jennie Wickliff Knight (1846–1908) in 1881, with whom he had four more children, and who survived him.

Early career
When John O'Ferrall died suddenly in 1855, the local judge thought highly enough of Charles O'Ferrall to appoint the fifteen-year-old to hold the clerk's post until an election could be held. Charles O'Ferrall later won an election, at seventeen, to a full six-year term as Clerk of Court. However, he only served less than half the term before the Civil War began.

Confederate service
Although Morgan County and what became West Virginia was predominantly loyal to the United States, O'Ferrall supported Virginia's decision to declare secession and joined the Confederate States Army. Enlisting as a private in the 12th Virginia cavalry, O'Ferrall was immediately offered the position of sergeant. He subsequently distinguished himself in several battles, leading to promotion to the rank of major and was allowed to form a cavalry battalion, the 23rd Virginia Cavalry. By war's end, O'Ferrall was a colonel in command of all cavalry in the Shenandoah Valley. His regiment engaged in the last fight of the war on Virginia soil. O'Ferrall was also wounded eight times in battle, including once so seriously that he was left for dead.

Legal career and re-entry into state politics
After the war, O'Ferrall returned to run the family's inn. However, he found this both personally and financially unfulfilling. He decided to pursue a law degree at Washington College (later Washington and Lee University). He graduated in 1869 and started a law practice in Harrisonburg.

After the restoration of civil rights for former Confederates, O'Ferrall quickly returned to politics and successfully ran for the Virginia House of Delegates in 1871. However, the following year, he lost his attempt for a seat in the U.S. Congress. In 1874, fellow legislators elected O'Ferrall as a judge for Rockingham County. However, he found the job tedious and returned to his private legal practice when his six-year term ended.

After several years of practicing law and assisting various Conservative Democratic candidates, O'Ferrall challenged the one-term incumbent John Paul (former Rockingham County Commonwealth attorney and state senator who ran as a Readjuster Democrat) for Virginia's 7th congressional district in 1883. The initial election vote count showed O'Ferrall down by 200 votes (out of 24,000 in a three-person race), but he contested the result and eventually won the seat. O'Ferrall subsequently won reelection five times, serving ten years in the House of Representatives (and Paul became a U.S. District judge). O'Ferrall's congressional career was largely unremarkable, though he did gain a reputation as a staunch advocate for Virginia and of Democratic President Grover Cleveland.

Governor
After two failed attempts to gain the Democratic nomination for Virginia's governor, O'Ferrall determined to make a strong push in 1893. With the support of the statewide Democratic organization formed by Virginia's U.S. Senator Thomas Staples Martin, O'Ferrall easily won the nomination. The Republicans decided not to contest the election, so O'Ferrall's only opponent was Populist Party candidate Edmund R. Cocke whom he defeated with 59.71% of the vote.  O'Ferrall benefited from fears of populism and Black equality to win the election with the largest majority that any Virginia governor had ever received.

The first half of O'Ferrall's term as governor was highlighted by his willingness to use strong measures to preserve law and order. He dispatched armed forces to protect nonstriking miners and maintain peace during a miners' strike and also to drive Coxey's "army" of protest marchers out of the state. Despite his public stance as a white supremacist, O'Ferrall was also quick to send troops to break up mob violence and prevent lynchings. His actions thus defused several high-profile situations, and he remained a generally popular governor through the end of 1895.

In 1896, the politics of the Democratic party were dominated by the issue of bimetallism and "Free Silver", alienating O'Ferrall, who had always been a staunch advocate of the gold standard. The silver issue culminated in the selection of William Jennings Bryan as the Democratic 1896 presidential candidate. As a result, O'Ferrall became one of a small group of Virginia Democrats who supported the gold standard and opposed Bryan's candidacy.  This stand undermined O'Ferrall's popularity and political support and ensured that he would be a lame duck with no significant political accomplishments for the remainder of his term as governor.

Electoral history

1884; O'Ferrall was elected to the U.S. House of Representatives with 56.37% of the vote, defeating Republican Dr. Joseph B. Webb.
1886; O'Ferrall was re-elected with 51.71% of the vote, defeating Independent Democrat John E. Roller.
1888; O'Ferrall was re-elected with 54.32% of the vote, defeating now-Republican Roller and Populist John C. Rivercombe.
1890; O'Ferrall was re-elected with 89.25% of the vote, defeating Republican I.M. Underwood.
1892; O'Ferrall was re-elected with 64% of the vote, defeating Populist Edmund R. Cocke.

Departure from politics and death
O'Ferrall's opposition to the silver issue undermined the last years of his governorship and effectively led to his retirement from public life.  He subsequently attempted a return to the practice of law, but his practice was undermined by significant health issues partly the result of the wounds he had suffered during the Civil War.  In 1904, he published his autobiography titled, Forty Years of Active Service. Shortly after its publication, O'Ferrall died on September 22, 1905, in Richmond, Virginia, and was buried in the Hollywood Cemetery.

The Library of Virginia maintains his executive papers. His papers are held by the Special Collections Research Center at the College of William & Mary. Additional papers are held by the James Madison University library.

References

External links
 
 

1840 births
1905 deaths
Democratic Party governors of Virginia
Virginia lawyers
Burials at Hollywood Cemetery (Richmond, Virginia)
Democratic Party members of the Virginia House of Delegates
Washington and Lee University alumni
People from Bath (Berkeley Springs), West Virginia
People of West Virginia in the American Civil War
Confederate States Army officers
People of Virginia in the American Civil War
County clerks in Virginia
People from Harrisonburg, Virginia
Military personnel from West Virginia
Democratic Party members of the United States House of Representatives from Virginia
19th-century American politicians
19th-century American lawyers